Since the invention of the very first railway steam locomotive in 1804, railway companies have applied names to their locomotives, carriages and multiple units. Numbers have usually been applied too, but not always; the Great Western Railway only applied names to its own broad gauge locomotives (though numbers were given to such locomotives that it inherited from elsewhere).

Locomotive names have been inspired by a variety of topics over the two centuries of railway operation in the United Kingdom, and the principal themes are set out in the table below, together with some examples of locomotive classes where all or a large proportion carried such names. Two other types of thematic naming of locomotive classes have occurred:
 Each name, though drawn from a variety of different people and things, was strongly connected to the locality through which the owning railway operated. For example the Metropolitan Railway's electric locomotives built in the 1920s carried the names of famous and fictional Londoners of varying types.
 Each name commenced with the same word or letters. For example, British Rail's Class 52 engines each carried a two-word name, the first of which was Western, Foster Yeoman's Class 59 engines similarly had Yeoman as the first word, and the Class 47 engines operated by Rail Express Systems had names commencing with the letters Res.

References

Notes

References

British Rail numbering and classification systems
Rolling stock of Great Britain